Chhote Miyan is a comedy show that airs on Colors TV hosted by Juhi Parmar and Kapil Sharma with  Rahul Mahajan and Sachin Pilgaonkar serving as judges on the show and written by Late Mumukshu Mudgal, Gunjan Joshi and Mubeen Saudaagar.
The show also has one spin off after season one, named Chhote Miyaan, Bade Miyaan.

References

Colors TV original programming
2008 Indian television series debuts